Keane Gilford is a professional rugby league footballer who plays as a er for St Helens (Heritage № 1278) in the Betfred Super League.

Gilford made his first team début for Saints in August 2022 against Wakefield Trinity.

References

External links
St Helens profile
Saints Heritage Society profile

2003 births
Living people
English rugby league players
Rugby league players from St Helens, Merseyside
Rugby league wingers
St Helens R.F.C. players